Qulin   is a town located in Butler County in Southeast Missouri, United States. The population was 460 at the 2020 census.

Qulin is included within the Poplar Bluff Metropolitan Statistical Area.

History
A post office called Qulin has been in operation since 1881. The origin of the name Qulin is obscure. Qulin has been declared the "most difficult to pronounce" place name in the state of Missouri by Reader's Digest.

Geography
Qulin is located in southeastern Butler County at the intersection of Missouri Route 51 and Missouri Route 53. It is 13 miles southeast of Poplar Bluff. It is in the flatlands of southeast Missouri with the Black River two miles to the west and the St. Francis River two miles to the east. The Missouri-Arkansas border is six miles south.

Demographics

2010 census
As of the census of 2010, there were 458 people, 202 households, and 113 families residing in the city. The racial makeup of the city was 97.16% White, 0.66% Native American, 0.22% from other races, and 1.97% from two or more races. Hispanic or Latino of any race were 1.09% of the population.

There were 202 households, of which 26.2% had children under the age of 18 living with them, 35.1% were married couples living together, 16.8% had a female householder with no husband present, 4.0% had a male householder with no wife present, and 44.1% were non-families. 37.6% of all households were made up of individuals, and 18.3% had someone living alone who was 65 years of age or older. The average household size was 2.24 and the average family size was 3.01.

The median age in the city was 44 years. 22.9% of residents were under the age of 18; 6.7% were between the ages of 18 and 24; 22.3% were from 25 to 44; 31.1% were from 45 to 64; and 17.2% were 65 years of age or older. The gender makeup of the city was 46.7% male and 53.3% female.

2000 census
As of the census of 2000, there were 467 people, 210 households, and 120 families residing in the city. The population density was 1,047.2 people per square mile (400.7/km2). There were 232 housing units at an average density of 520.3 per square mile (199.1/km2). The racial makeup of the city was 98.50% White, 0.43% African American, and 1.07% from two or more races. Hispanic or Latino of any race were 0.21% of the population.

There were 210 households, out of which 25.2% had children under the age of 18 living with them, 41.9% were married couples living together, 13.3% had a female householder with no husband present, and 42.4% were non-families. 40.5% of all households were made up of individuals, and 23.3% had someone living alone who was 65 years of age or older. The average household size was 2.20 and the average family size was 2.98.

In the city the population was spread out, with 25.1% under the age of 18, 5.1% from 18 to 24, 25.3% from 25 to 44, 23.8% from 45 to 64, and 20.8% who were 65 years of age or older. The median age was 40 years. For every 100 females, there were 91.4 males. For every 100 females age 18 and over, there were 85.2 males.

The median income for a household in the city was $15,714, and the median income for a family was $19,250. Males had a median income of $21,000 versus $15,481 for females. The per capita income for the city was $9,594. About 24.8% of families and 28.1% of the population were below the poverty line, including 30.3% of those under age 18 and 34.2% of those age 65 or over.

Climate
Climate is characterized by relatively high temperatures and evenly distributed precipitation throughout the year.  The Köppen Climate Classification subtype for this climate is "Cfa"  (Humid Subtropical Climate).

Education
Twin Rivers R-X School District serves the community and operates the Qulin School as well as Twin Rivers High School in Broseley.

References

Cities in Butler County, Missouri
Cities in Missouri